Ballads of Love is a 10-track collection of previously recorded songs by Bobby Vinton; it was released in 1985 by Heartland Music, which had previously released The Best of Bobby Vinton that same year. This collection contains six songs that Vinton recorded for ABC Records ("Feelings," "Paloma Blanca," "Beer Barrel Polka,"  "Help Me Make It Through the Night", "And I Love You So" and "The Way We Were")  one for Tapestry Records ("To All the Girls I've Loved Before"), and one for Ahed Records ("Medley"). The track of two covers of  
"You'll Never Know," and "Because of You"are re-recordings and first
appeared on this LP.

Track listing

Album credits
All selections courtesy of Rex Ford Productions, Inc.
Special thanks to Bobby Vinton, Joseph G. Zynczak, and Alan Bernhard

Ballads of Love
Ballads of Love